Anagelasta trimaculata is a species of beetle in the family Cerambycidae. It was described by Stephan von Breuning in 1938. It is known from India.

References

Mesosini
Beetles described in 1938